Since the inaugural award in 1956, Denmark has submitted fifty-nine films for consideration for the Academy Award for Best International Feature Film, fourteen of which succeeded in getting nominated for the Academy Award: Qivitoq (1958), Paw (1959), Harry and the Butler (1960), Babette's Feast (1987), Pelle the Conqueror (1988), Memories of a Marriage (1989), After the Wedding (2006), In a Better World (2010), A Royal Affair (2012), The Hunt (2013), A War (2015), Land Of Mine (2016), Another Round (2020) and Flee (2021). Four Danish films have won the Oscar: Babette's Feast (1987), Pelle the Conqueror (1988), In a Better World (2010) and Another Round (2020).

The official Danish submission is selected annually in late summer by the Danish Film Institute

In 1957, Denmark became the first country to send a film with a female director to the Foreign Oscar competition (Annelise Hovmand's Be Dear to Me). Two years later, Astrid Henning-Jensen's Paw became to the first film directed by a woman to receive a nomination in the category.

Between 1998 and 2002, four out of five Danish submissions were made according to the austere Dogme 95 principles. None were nominated and none have been submitted since.

Submissions
The Academy of Motion Picture Arts and Sciences has invited the film industries of various countries to submit their best film for the Academy Award for Best Foreign Language Film since 1956. The Foreign Language Film Award Committee oversees the process and reviews all the submitted films. Following this, they vote via secret ballot to determine the five nominees for the award. Below is a list of the films that have been submitted by Denmark for review by the Academy for the award by year.

Shortlisted Films
Each year since 2010, the Danish Film Institute has announced a three-film shortlist prior to announcing the official Danish Oscar candidate. The following films were shortlisted by Denmark but not selected as the final candidate:

 2022: As in Heaven, Forever
 2021: Margrete: Queen of the North, The Shadow in My Eye
 2020: A Perfectly Normal Family, Enforcement
 2019: Before the Frost, Daniel
 2018: A Fortunate Man, Winter Brothers
 2017: Darkland, Word of God
 2016: The Commune, Walk with Me
 2015: The Look of Silence, Men & Chicken
 2014: Someone You Love, Speed Walking
 2013: The Act of Killing, Northwest
 2012: Love Is All You Need, The Passion of Marie
 2011: A Family, A Funny Man
 2010: R, Submarino

See also
List of Greenlandic submissions for the Academy Award for Best International Feature Film

Notes

References

Denmark
Academy Award